Pierre Schmitz (16 May 1920 – 7 December 2004) was a Luxembourgian gymnast. He competed in eight events at the 1948 Summer Olympics.

References

1920 births
2004 deaths
Luxembourgian male artistic gymnasts
Olympic gymnasts of Luxembourg
Gymnasts at the 1948 Summer Olympics
People from Differdange
20th-century Luxembourgian people